Rahmatabad (also Romanized as Raḩmatābād; also known as Kalekh-Rakhmatabad, Qal‘eh Raḩmatābād, and Qal‘eh-ye Raḩmatābād) is a village in Khorramdarreh Rural District, in the Central District of Khorramdarreh County, Zanjan Province, Iran. At the 2006 census, its population was 872, in 208 families.

References 

Populated places in Khorramdarreh County